The 2010 CAF Confederation Cup Final was the final of 2010 CAF Confederation Cup. FUS Rabat from Morocco faced the CS Sfaxien from Tunisia.

Rabat won the second leg 3–2 at Sfaxien after the first leg ended in a scoreless draw.

Background
FUS Rabat qualified for the final on their first ever participation of the CAF Confederation Cup. For CS Sfaxien it's the fourth appearance; in their previous three appearances they won the cup all three times (1998, 2007, 2008). While Sfaxien had a bye in the preliminary round, Rabat needed to play one more round to qualify for the first round. Both teams were drawn into the same group at the group stage, where Sfaxien won the home leg 3–0 and Rabat the second leg at their home with 2–1. Both teams were already qualified for the semifinals on the second to last matchday.
At those semifinals Sfaxien won after penalties against Al-Hilal from the Sudan, after both legs ended 1–0 for the representative home team.
Rabat won the first leg away at Ittihad 2–1, lost at home 0–1, but still made it to the final because of the away goals rule.

Route to the final

Details

First leg

Second leg

References

External links
 
 CAF Site

Final
2010
CS Sfaxien matches
Fath Union Sport matches